Cyperus ciliatus is a species of sedge that is native to parts of Mexico and Central America.

See also 
 List of Cyperus species

References 

ciliatus
Plants described in 1831
Flora of Mexico
Flora of El Salvador
Flora of Honduras
Taxa named by Franz Wilhelm Junghuhn